The Hatfield Little Bird aircraft are a continuation of the Arup series of low aspect ratio aircraft.

Development
In the late 1920s, Cloyd Snyder of South Bend, Indiana developed a series of "Heel Lift" low aspect ratio aircraft inspired by the gliding properties of felt heel inserts. South Bend native, Milt Hatfield had built a homebuilt aircraft at the same time. Seeking flying lessons while grounded by his father, he donated parts of his aircraft to the Arup S-2 project in exchange for flying lessons. Years later, Hatfield taught the buyer of the S-2 how to fly the plane, and salvaged parts from his own plane to keep it going. After Arup Manufacturing Corporation went out of business, Hatfield promised Snyder he would make one of his own.

Operational history
All three Little Bird aircraft were bought by one owner and are awaiting restoration.

Variants
Hatfield Prototype
A wood and fabric heel lift aircraft started in the 1980s and scrapped.
Hatfield Prototype 2
Another straight winged wood and fabric aircraft scrapped after one flight.
Little Bird #1
An ultralight swept wing heel lift.
Little Bird #2
N7019P A heavier experimental category aircraft. (1988) 
Little Bird #3
An advanced ultralight design with a 27hp Rotax.

Specifications (Little Bird #1)

See also

References

External links
Little Bird Website
Flying with Milt

Homebuilt aircraft
Low-wing aircraft
Single-engined tractor aircraft
Aircraft first flown in 1986
1980s United States sport aircraft
1980s United States ultralight aircraft